Haydi Şimdi Gel is the tenth Turkey's first album which had Turkish Arabesque Music mixed with Turkish Pop Music.  The album, released in 1993, sold 3 million copies.

Track listing
 "Bizi Kimse Ayıramaz"
 "Di Gel Kiz Gel"
 "Gitme Sevgilim"
 "Haram Geceler"
 "Haydi Şimdi Gel"
 "Tik Tak"
 "Töre"
 "Yaz Gazeteci"
 "Ye Kürküm"
 "Yüreğimde Bir Ateş"
 "Zor Gelir"

1993 albums
Emrah (singer) albums